Osian Assembly constituency is one of constituencies of Rajasthan Legislative Assembly in the Pali (Lok Sabha constituency). Senior Congress leaders like Paras Ram Maderna, Narendra  used contest election from this seat.

List of MLA

See also
Member of the Legislative Assembly (India)

References

Jodhpur district
Assembly constituencies of Rajasthan